Chrysochromioides is a genus of flies in the family Stratiomyidae.

Species
Chrysochromioides micropunctata Brunetti, 1926

References

Stratiomyidae
Brachycera genera
Taxa named by Enrico Adelelmo Brunetti
Diptera of Africa
Monotypic Brachycera genera